Magoo's Puddle Jumper is a 1956 animated short produced by UPA for Columbia Pictures. Directed by Pete Burness and produced by Stephen Bosustow, Magoo's Puddle Jumper won the 1957 Oscar for Short Subjects (Cartoons).

Summary
The cartoon follows the misadventures of the myopic Mr. Magoo alongside nephew Waldo as he drives a new electric car into the ocean.

References

External links
 

1956 short films
1956 animated films
1950s animated short films
Best Animated Short Academy Award winners
Mr. Magoo
Columbia Pictures short films
UPA films
Columbia Pictures animated short films
Films scored by Dean Elliott
1950s English-language films
American animated short films